Ramphotrigon is a genus of tyrant flycatchers in the family Tyrannidae.

Species
Established in 1872 by George Robert Gray, it contains four species:

The name Ramphotrigon is a combination of the Greek words rhamphos, meaning "bill" and trigonōn, meaning "triangle".

References

 
Bird genera
Taxa named by George Robert Gray